Vernon C. "Verne" Miller (August 25, 1896 – November 29, 1933) was a freelance Prohibition gunman, bootlegger, bank robber and former sheriff in Huron, South Dakota, who, as the only identified gunman in the Kansas City massacre, was found beaten and strangled to death shortly after the incident.

Early life
Born in Kimball, South Dakota, Miller moved 35 miles northeast to Huron in 1914 and began working as an auto mechanic. Two years later Miller enlisted in the U.S. Army, seeing action in the Mexican expedition into Mexico, launched after repeated bandit raids across the border. After the United States entry into World War I, Miller served in France with the 18th Infantry Regiment and, decorated for valor and bravery, he rose to the rank of color sergeant by the war's end.

After being discharged from the military in 1918, Miller returned to Huron and joined the city's police force as a patrolman. Resigning from the Huron Police Department in May 1920, he ran for the sheriff's office of Beadle County, eventually winning the local election in November. Within two years, however, Miller reportedly tired of the job and fled the area in early 1922 after withdrawing $2,600 in county revenue. Within a year, Miller was tracked down by investigators and convicted of embezzlement on April 4, 1923.

While imprisoned at the South Dakota State Penitentiary, Miller became the warden's personal chauffeur. He was granted parole in November 1924.

Prohibition
By the time of Miller's release, Prohibition was in full effect in the country and Miller readily entered the lucrative, although at times dangerous, occupational field of bootlegging. He was fined $200 for bootlegging by a Sioux Falls, South Dakota, court in October 1925, but had a clear record for several years thereafter.

During the late 1920s, after years of heavy drug abuse and suffering from advanced syphilis, Miller became increasingly unstable, and he was often given to unpredictable bursts of violence. He was indicted on February 3, 1928 for the wounding of two Minneapolis police officers, but the case against him was dropped owing to lack of evidence.

From Prohibition gun for hire to Depression-era outlaw
As the end of the decade approached, Miller was widely known as a freelance gunman for Midwest bootleggers and racketeers. Due to Verne Miller's excellent marksmanship, allegedly there was a joke among the gangsters that Miller can "sign" his name with a Thompson submachine gun.  On May 31, 1930, after a friend of Miller's, Eugene "Red" McLaughlin, had been killed by members of Al Capone's Chicago Outfit, (McLaughlin's body was found in a Chicago Canal) Miller tracked down three of the suspects to a resort hotel in Fox Lake, Illinois and gunned them down on June 1. Later known as the Fox Lake Massacre, this event was attributed to members of George Moran's North Side Gang.

With the end of Prohibition approaching, Miller teamed up with Harvey Bailey, George "Machine Gun" Kelly and three others in a daylight raid resulting in the theft of $70,000 from a bank in Willmar, Minnesota, on July 15, 1930.

On August 13, in an argument over a "double-cross" from the bank robbery, Miller killed Frank "Weinie" Coleman, Mike Rusick and "Jew" Sammy Stein and dumped their bodies at White Bear Lake.

The murders did not seem to affect Miller's relationship with his accomplices as he again participated with Bailey, Holden, Keating, Kelly and Lawrence De Vol in robbing a bank in Ottumwa, Iowa, for $40,000 on September 9, 1930.

Again with Bailey, Kelly, Frank "Jelly" Nash and several others, Miller stole another $40,000 from a bank in Sherman, Texas, on April 8, 1931.

On December 16, 1932, during a bank robbery in Minneapolis, two policemen were killed by the Miller gang.

Kansas City Massacre
Following the Sherman bank robbery, Miller retired from armed robbery in favor of murder for hire, although he continued to keep in contact with his former partners. It was through these contacts, specifically Chicago mobster Louis Stacci, that Miller was hired to free former partner Frank Nash from federal custody while he was being transported to Leavenworth Federal Penitentiary.

On June 17, 1933, Miller and several other unidentified gunmen ambushed federal agents as they arrived at Union Station in Kansas City, Missouri. After a brief yet violent gunfight—resulting in the deaths of Nash and four law enforcement officers, as well as the wounding of two others—Miller and the other gunmen fled the scene.

Although FBI Director J. Edgar Hoover named Charles "Pretty Boy" Floyd and Adam Richetti as participants in the event, the remaining gunmen were never identified.

Final days
After the Kansas City Massacre, Miller fled to the east coast, staying with New Jersey mobster Abner "Longy" Zwillman in Orange, New Jersey until Miller killed a Zwillman gunman in an argument. Leaving for Chicago on October 23, 1933, Miller posed as a salesman for an optical supply house while living with girlfriend Vi Mathias until federal agents raided her apartment on the morning of November 1. Shooting his way out, however, Miller was able to escape from federal agents.

A month later, on November 29, a motorist discovered Miller's body in a roadside ditch outside Detroit, Michigan. He appeared to have been tortured by strangulation with a clothesline and beaten to death with a claw hammer. Miller appeared to have been the victim of a gangland slaying. Although the motive for Miller's grisly murder remains unclear, probable causes include retaliation for the murder of Zwillman's gang member one month earlier, punishment for the failure of the Kansas City Massacre, or perhaps retribution for the Fox Lake Massacre.

Portrayal in movies
Miller's life is the subject of a 1987 movie directed by Rod Hewitt and released under the title The Verne Miller Story or Gangland: The Verne Miller Story in which Miller is portrayed by actor Scott Glenn.

See also
List of unsolved murders

References

Books
Newton, Michael. Encyclopedia of Robbers, Heists, and Capers. New York: Facts On File Inc., 2002.
 Merle Clayton Union Station Massacre 1975 BM Bobbs Merrill

External links
Wayward Soldier: Verne Miller and the Kansas City Massacre  – Radio documentary, listen online.

1896 births
1933 deaths
20th-century American politicians
American bank robbers
American gangsters
United States Army personnel of World War I
American municipal police officers
Depression-era gangsters
Fugitives
Male murder victims
Military personnel from South Dakota
Murdered American gangsters
People from Brule County, South Dakota
People from Huron, South Dakota
Prohibition-era gangsters
South Dakota sheriffs
Unsolved murders in the United States